Francesco Santoliquido (1883–1971) was an Italian composer. He studied at the Liceo di Santa Cecilia in Rome, graduating in 1908. His best-known works are his Tre Poesie Persiane, for voice and piano recorded by Amel Brahim-Djelloul and Anne Le Bozec in 2008.

He was born August 6, 1883, in San Giorgio a Cremano (Naples).

His compositions included a violin sonata, a string quartet, a symphony among other works including as noted a number for voice.

He died August 26, 1971, in Anacapri.

References

External links

Italian classical composers
Italian male classical composers
1883 births
1971 deaths
Musicians from Naples
20th-century classical composers
20th-century Italian composers
20th-century Italian male musicians